Mustafizur Rahaman Chowdhury is a Bangladesh Awami League politician and the incumbent Member of Parliament from Chittagong-16.

Early life
Chowdhury was born on 20 December 1957. He has a B.A. and a M.A. degree.

Career
Chowdhury was elected to parliament in 2014 from Chittagong-16 as a Bangladesh Awami League candidate.

Controversy
On 1 June 2016, he was accused of assaulting Zahidul Islam, an upazila election officer, during the Union Parishad polls. The election officer complained to the District Commissioner who notified Bangladesh Election Commission. Zahidul Islam filed a case with the Banshkhali Police Station against Chowdhury and two of his associates. The Bangladesh High Court asked him to appear before the court by 20 June 2016 and ordered law enforcement agencies to arrest him if he fails to appear before the court. He secured bail from Judicial Magistrate Md Sajjad Hossain of local court on 16 June.

References

Awami League politicians
Living people
People from Banshkhali Upazila
10th Jatiya Sangsad members
11th Jatiya Sangsad members
1957 births